The 155th Massachusetts General Court, consisting of the Massachusetts Senate and the Massachusetts House of Representatives, met from January 1, 1947, to June 18, 1948, during the governorship of Robert F. Bradford, in Boston.

State Senate

Districts
As established by Chapter 507 of the Acts of 1939. The state census of 1935 was the basis of the apportionment.

(*)Terminated. See Acts of 1927, chapter 321; Acts of 1938, chapter 240 and 455.

Senators

Employees
 Irving N. Hayden, Clerk of the Senate
 Thomas A. Chadwick, Assistant Clerk of the Senate
 William F. Dillon, Clerical Assistant to Clerk of the Senate
 Frederick May Elliot, Chaplain of the Senate
 William F. Furbush, Secretary to the President of the Senate and Clerk of the Senate Committee on Rules
 Fernald Hutchins, Counsel to the Senate
 Thomas R. Bateman, Assistant Counsel to the Senate
 Royal B. Patriquin, Assistant to Counsel of the Senate

Representatives

See also
 1948 Massachusetts gubernatorial election
 80th United States Congress
 List of Massachusetts General Courts

References

Further reading

External links
 
 
 
 

Political history of Massachusetts
Massachusetts legislative sessions
massachusetts
massachusetts